Moscow City Duma District 20 is one of 45 constituencies in Moscow City Duma. The constituency has covered parts of South-Eastern and Eastern Moscow since 2014. From 1993-2005 District 20 was based in Southern Moscow; however, after the number of constituencies was reduced to 15 in 2005, the constituency was eliminated.

Members elected

Election results

2001

|-
! colspan=2 style="background-color:#E9E9E9;text-align:left;vertical-align:top;" |Candidate
! style="background-color:#E9E9E9;text-align:left;vertical-align:top;" |Party
! style="background-color:#E9E9E9;text-align:right;" |Votes
! style="background-color:#E9E9E9;text-align:right;" |%
|-
|style="background-color:"|
|align=left|Mikhail Antontsev
|align=left|Independent
|
|44.74%
|-
|style="background-color:"|
|align=left|Mark Vasilyev
|align=left|Independent
|
|13.82%
|-
|style="background-color:"|
|align=left|Vladimir Rabinkov
|align=left|Yabloko
|
|11.63%
|-
|style="background-color:"|
|align=left|Yury Kaminsky
|align=left|Independent
|
|8.81%
|-
|style="background-color:#000000"|
|colspan=2 |against all
|
|17.36%
|-
| colspan="5" style="background-color:#E9E9E9;"|
|- style="font-weight:bold"
| colspan="3" style="text-align:left;" | Total
| 
| 100%
|-
| colspan="5" style="background-color:#E9E9E9;"|
|- style="font-weight:bold"
| colspan="4" |Source:
|
|}

2014

|-
! colspan=2 style="background-color:#E9E9E9;text-align:left;vertical-align:top;" |Candidate
! style="background-color:#E9E9E9;text-align:left;vertical-align:top;" |Party
! style="background-color:#E9E9E9;text-align:right;" |Votes
! style="background-color:#E9E9E9;text-align:right;" |%
|-
|style="background-color:"|
|align=left|Andrey Shibayev
|align=left|Rodina
|
|50.86%
|-
|style="background-color:"|
|align=left|Aleksandr Timchenko
|align=left|Communist Party
|
|19.08%
|-
|style="background-color:"|
|align=left|Yevgeny Korsakov
|align=left|Liberal Democratic Party
|
|8.01%
|-
|style="background-color:"|
|align=left|Aleksandr Molokhov
|align=left|Yabloko
|
|7.83%
|-
|style="background-color:"|
|align=left|Aleksandr Pavlenko
|align=left|A Just Russia
|
|7.05%
|-
|style="background-color:"|
|align=left|Vitaly Shulmin
|align=left|Independent
|
|3.59%
|-
| colspan="5" style="background-color:#E9E9E9;"|
|- style="font-weight:bold"
| colspan="3" style="text-align:left;" | Total
| 
| 100%
|-
| colspan="5" style="background-color:#E9E9E9;"|
|- style="font-weight:bold"
| colspan="4" |Source:
|
|}

2019

|-
! colspan=2 style="background-color:#E9E9E9;text-align:left;vertical-align:top;" |Candidate
! style="background-color:#E9E9E9;text-align:left;vertical-align:top;" |Party
! style="background-color:#E9E9E9;text-align:right;" |Votes
! style="background-color:#E9E9E9;text-align:right;" |%
|-
|style="background-color:"|
|align=left|Yevgeny Stupin
|align=left|Communist Party
|
|45.03%
|-
|style="background-color:"|
|align=left|Maksim Shingarkin
|align=left|Rodina
|
|21.91%
|-
|style="background-color:"|
|align=left|Valery Danilovtsev
|align=left|A Just Russia
|
|10.65%
|-
|style="background-color:"|
|align=left|Viktor Bukreyev
|align=left|Liberal Democratic Party
|
|9.43%
|-
|style="background-color:"|
|align=left|Dmitry Zakharov
|align=left|Communists of Russia
|
|8.01%
|-
| colspan="5" style="background-color:#E9E9E9;"|
|- style="font-weight:bold"
| colspan="3" style="text-align:left;" | Total
| 
| 100%
|-
| colspan="5" style="background-color:#E9E9E9;"|
|- style="font-weight:bold"
| colspan="4" |Source:
|
|}

References

Moscow City Duma districts